Todd London is a senior vice president at Walt Disney Motion Pictures. Films he has worked on include The Jungle Book, Beauty and the Beast, Saving Mr. Banks. He has worked on several series for HBO, including Carnivàle, Rome, and The Pacific which he received an Emmy for his producing. He was a producer on the first series of AMC drama Mad Men.

References

External links
 
 

Year of birth missing (living people)
Living people
American television producers